The Bochum/Gelsenkirchen tramway network is a network of tramways focused on Bochum and Gelsenkirchen,  two cities in the federal state of North Rhine-Westphalia, Germany.

Opened in 1894 in Bochum and in 1895 in Gelsenkirchen, the network is operated by the Bochum-Gelsenkirchener Straßenbahnen AG (BOGESTRA), and integrated in the Verkehrsverbund Rhein-Ruhr (VRR).  It also serves the neighbouring towns of Hattingen, Herne and Witten.

Lines 
, the following nine tram lines are operated exclusively by BOGESTRA:

In addition, a tenth tram line serves the BOGESTRA region:

This line, which is operated by the Ruhrbahn for most of the week, has its northernmost 11 stations in the BOGESTRA transit area. Early on Saturday mornings, it is operated by BOGESTRA, and runs between Gelsenkirchen Hbf and Trabrennbahn only.

Rolling stock
The tram network currently operates a fleet of 95 Variobahn trams (by Stadler Rail). The type NF6D (made by DÜWAG and similar to the R1.1 cars of Bonn tramway's system) and type M high-floor articulated trams (also from DÜWAG) have been retired by 2021 and were replaced by the Variobahns. 

The Stadtbahn line uses a separate fleet of high-floor Stadtbahnwagen B and Tango trains. It is not connected to the low-floor network and therefore trams on one system cannot operate on the other.

See also
 Bochum Stadtbahn
 Trams in Germany
 List of town tramway systems in Germany
 Rhine-Ruhr Stadtbahn
 Verkehrsverbund Rhein-Ruhr

References

Inline references

Bibliography

External links
 
 
 BOGESTRA Homepage 
 Track plan of the Bochum/Gelsenkirchen tram system
 
 
 

Bochum
Gelsenkirchen
Bochum Gelsenkirchen
Transport in North Rhine-Westphalia
Metre gauge railways in Germany
600 V DC railway electrification
750 V DC railway electrification
Bochum